The Réunion women's national football team is the national football team of Réunion, a French island, and is not recognised by FIFA.  They have played international matches against Egypt, South Africa, Zimbabwe, Uganda and Mauritius. There is a two-level women's league in the country, with promotion and relegation between each division.

History
The national team is not recognised by FIFA. In 2000, they participated in the African Women's Championships.  They qualified by beating Egypt women's national football team 5–4 on aggregate (winning 4–3 at home and drawing the away leg 1–1).  The first match at the final tournament was a 0–3 loss to South Africa women's national football team in Vosloorus.  The second match they played in was a 1–2 loss to Zimbabwe women's national football team.  Their final match was a 1–2 loss to Uganda women's national football team.  They finished last in their group.  Members of the team who played in the tournament included Carole Keita, Lise May Ouledi, Tania Nice, Laurianne Boyer, Claure Lebon, Kelly Bello, Marie Therese Fanovana, Prisca Maraguet, Cathy Chateauroux, Nadege Grosmane, Martine Turpin, Rachelle Lecoutre, Florence Mussard. The side was coached by Patrick Honorine. To date, this is the only competition in CAF which Réunion have participated and qualified. In July 2011, there were plans to host a COSAFA Women's Championship in Réunion. The competition was eventually held in Zimbabwe and Réunion did not participate. On 3 June 2012, Réunion recorded their biggest win to date, winning 3–0 against Mauritius, who were playing their first ever international match.

The Réunion women's national under-20 football team competed in the 2010 African U-20 Women's World Cup Qualifying Tournament. They beat Madagascar 3–1 away from home in the first leg, and went on to win the second leg 4–1 at home.

Results and fixtures
The following is a list of match results in the last 12 months, as well as any future matches that have been scheduled.
Legend

2012

2015

2022

Players

Current squad
The following players were called up for the friendly matche against the Seychelles on 23 November 2022. 
Caps and goals correct as of 23 November 2022

Previous squads
Africa Women Cup of Nations
2000 African Women's Championship squad

Honours
Football at the Indian Ocean Island Games: Champion 2015

References

External links
 Réunion Island CAF Profile
  Réunion Island Football Association site

 
African women's national association football teams